Julián Arcas (25 October 1832 – 16 February 1882) was a Spanish classical guitarist and composer, who influenced Francisco Tárrega and Antonio de Torres. He was "one of the most important figures in Spanish music in the 19th century".

Biography
Arcas was born in María, Almería, and died in Antequera, Malaga. From 1860 until 1872, he performed all over Europe. The young Francisco Tárrega listened to him in 1863 in Castellón and played for him after the performance, on the request of Tárrega's father. Arcas then invited Tárrega to study with him in Barcelona. Between 1864 and 1870, Arcas performed all over Spain, in some of these appearances partnering with a pianist called Patanas, after which he retired to Almería, establishing a business in Calle Granada.

Arcas wrote fifty-two original works and transcribed thirty further pieces for the guitar, including waltzes, variations, preludes and dances. Thirty were published in Barcelona by Vidal y Roger and fifty in Madrid by Unión Musical Española.

Through the work of the guitar maker Antonio de Torres Jurado, Arcas influenced the development of the classical guitar, particularly with regard to the design of the soundboard.

Bibliography
 Eusebio Rioja: Julián Arcas o los albores de la guitarra flamenca (Sevilla: Bienal de Arte Flamenco, 1990), .
 Javier Suárez-Pajares: "Julián Arcas: Figura clave de la Guitarra Española", in: Actas del XV Congreso de la Sociedad Internacional de Musicología: Culturas musicales del Mediterraneo y sus ramificaciónes, vol. 4, (Madrid, 1992).
 Eusebio Rioja: "Julián Arcas Lacal (1832–1882), concertista internacional, compositor y maestro de guitarra", in: Revista velezana no. 12 (1993), p. 43–54.
 Melchor Rodríguez (ed.): Julián Arcas. Obras Completas para Guitarra / Guitar Works (Madrid: Soneto, 1993), .
 Javier Suárez-Pajares, Eusebio Rioja Vázquez: El guitarrista almeriense Julián Arcas (1832–1882): una biografía documental (Almería: Instituto de Estudios Almerienses, 2003), .

Selected recordings
 Julián Arcas: Complete Guitar Music, performed by Gabriele Zanetti; 4-CD-set (Brilliant Classics 95639, 2020).

References

External links
 
 New scores of Julián Arcas

1832 births
1882 deaths
19th-century classical composers
19th-century Spanish male musicians
Composers for the classical guitar
Spanish classical composers
Spanish classical guitarists
Spanish male classical composers
Spanish male guitarists
Spanish Romantic composers
19th-century guitarists